UFO is a 2022 Turkish film directed by Onur Bilgetay, written by Meryem Gültabak and starring İpek Filiz Yazıcı, Mert Ramazan Demir and Ferit Aktuğ. The film was released on 23 February 2022 on Netflix.

Cast 
 İpek Filiz Yazıcı
 Mert Ramazan Demir
 Ferit Aktuğ
 Nilsu Yılmaz
 Elif Çakman
 Cemile Çiğdem Canyurt
 Eda Akalın
 Mekin Sezer
 Enes Küllahçi
 Kerem Alp Kabul
 Görkem Ökten

References

External links 

 
 

2022 films
Turkish drama films
Turkish-language Netflix original films
2020s Turkish-language films